The 2007 South Kesteven District Council election took place on 3 May 2007 to elect members of South Kesteven District Council in Lincolnshire, England. The whole council was up for election and the Conservative party stayed in overall control of the council.

Election result
The Conservatives kept a majority on the council making a net gain of one seat to have 35 councillors. The independents and Liberal Democrats also made gains at the expense of Labour who lost five of the seven seats they were defending. Overall turnout at the election was 35%, up from 29.65% at the last election in 2003.

The defeated Labour candidates included the group leader John Hurst, who lost his seat in Grantham St Johns to the Conservatives, and the party's deputy leader Rob Shorrock in Earlesfield, where independent candidates took two of the three seats for the ward. Labour also lost seats in St Anne's ward to an independent and a Conservative, as well as a seat in Isaac Newton ward to the Conservatives, however Labour did gain a seat in Harrowby. Other changes had Conservative council cabinet member Terl Bryant lose in All Saints ward, but a Conservative candidate defeated independent councillor Angeline Percival in Glen Eden.

Ward results

References

South Kesteven District Council elections
2007 English local elections